The 1962 NCAA Division I men's ice hockey tournament was the culmination of the 1961–62 NCAA men's ice hockey season, the 15th such tournament in NCAA history. It was held between March 15 and 17, 1962, and concluded with Michigan Tech defeating Clarkson 7-1. All games were played at the Utica Memorial Auditorium in Utica, New York.

Qualifying teams
Four teams qualified for the tournament, two each from the eastern and western regions. The ECAC tournament champion and the WCHA tournament champion received automatic bids into the tournament. Two at-large bids were offered to one eastern and one western team based upon both their tournament finish as well as their regular season record.

Format
The higher-ranked ECAC team was seeded as the top eastern team while the WCHA champion was given the top western seed. The second eastern seed was slotted to play the top western seed and vice versa. All games were played at the Utica Memorial Auditorium. All matches were Single-game eliminations with the semifinal winners advancing to the national championship game and the losers playing in a consolation game.

Bracket

Note: * denotes overtime period(s)

Semifinals

Clarkson vs. Michigan

Michigan Tech vs. St. Lawrence

Consolation Game

St. Lawrence vs. Michigan

National Championship

Clarkson vs. Michigan Tech

All-Tournament team

First Team
G: Richie Broadbelt (St. Lawrence)
D: Henry Åkervall (Michigan Tech)
D: Elov Seger (Michigan Tech)
F: Lou Angotti* (Michigan Tech)
F: Red Berenson (Michigan)
F: John Ivanitz (Michigan Tech)
* Most Outstanding Player(s)

Second Team
G: Garry Bauman (Michigan Tech)
D: Cal Wagner (Clarkson)
D: Don Rodgers (Michigan)
F: Jerry Sullivan (Michigan Tech)
F: Larry Babcock (Michigan)
F: Hal Pettersen (Clarkson)

References

Tournament
NCAA Division I men's ice hockey tournament
NCAA Men's Ice Hockey Tournament
NCAA Men's Ice Hockey Tournament
Ice hockey in New York (state)
Sports competitions in New York (state)
Utica, New York